Progress M-09M, identified by NASA as Progress 41P, is a Progress spacecraft which was launched in 2011 to resupply the International Space Station. It was the ninth Progress-M 11F615A60 spacecraft to be launched, and has the serial number 409. The spacecraft was manufactured by RKK Energia, and is operated by the Russian Federal Space Agency. It arrived at the space station during Expedition 26, and undocked during Expedition 27.

Launch and docking
Progress M-09M was launched from Pad 1/5 at the Baikonur Cosmodrome, on 28 January 2011 at 01:31:39 UTC. The Progress spacecraft subsequently raised its orbit, and manoeuvred to rendezvous with the space station. It arrived at the ISS on 30 January 2011, successfully docking to the nadir port of the Pirs at 02:39 UTC.

Cargo
Of the fuel aboard the spacecraft,  are reserved for orbital manoeuvres whilst docked, such as raising or lowering the station's orbit, whilst the remaining  will be used for refuelling the station itself.

The dry cargo aboard Progress M-09M includes parts for the oxygen and water supply systems and the thermal control system, as well as equipment for hardware control and the station's electrical and telemetry systems. For the crew, food, medical and hygiene equipment will also be delivered, as well as documentation and personal items including books by Konstantin Tsiolkovsky and a birthday present for station commander Scott Kelly.

The ARISSAT-1 or Kedr of 30 kg, miniaturised satellite was delivered to the ISS aboard Progress M-09M. It is an amateur radio satellite which will be deployed from the station during an EVA on 16 February 2011. The satellite will be operated by RSC Energia, and is part of the RadioSkaf programme. It is intended to commemorate the fiftieth anniversary of the Vostok 1 mission.

Inventory 
Total cargo mass delivered: 2666 kg.

Undocking and deorbit

Progress M-09M was undocked from the Pirs module at 11:41 UTC on 22 April 2011. After departing the space station, the spacecraft was used for Radar-Progress scientific experiment to investigate a reflection feature of the plasma generated by operations of the Progress propulsion. Upon the completion of this experiment the spacecraft was deorbited, and reentered over the "spacecraft cemetery" in the South Pacific Ocean. The deorbit manoeuvre was performed on 26 April 2011, with debris falling into the ocean at 13:23 UTC.

See also 

 2011 in spaceflight
 List of Progress flights
 Uncrewed spaceflights to the International Space Station

References 

Spacecraft launched in 2011
Progress (spacecraft) missions
Spacecraft which reentered in 2011
Spacecraft launched by Soyuz-U rockets
Supply vehicles for the International Space Station